Gay is the name of several inhabited localities in Russia.

Urban localities
Gay, Orenburg Oblast, a town in Orenburg Oblast

Rural localities
Gay, Samara Oblast, a settlement in Bolsheglushitsky District of Samara Oblast
Gay, Udmurt Republic, a village in Kyyludsky Selsoviet of Uvinsky District of the Udmurt Republic